Patric Laurence Dickinson  (born 24 November 1950) is an English genealogist. He served as Clarenceux King of Arms from 2010 until 2021. He has worked at the College of Arms in London since 1968.

Background
Dickinson was educated at Marling School in Stroud, Gloucestershire, before going to Exeter College, Oxford, where he read modern history and graduated as MA. He was President of the Oxford Union Society and was subsequently called to the Bar at the Middle Temple. Dickinson served as a research assistant at the College of Arms from 1968 until his appointment as Rouge Dragon Pursuivant of Arms in Ordinary in 1978. He served as Richmond Herald from 25 January 1989 until 6 April 2010.

On 6 April 2010, he was promoted to the office of Norroy and Ulster King of Arms, holding this office very briefly until he was further advanced to Clarenceux King of Arms on 1 September 2010. He was succeeded in April 2021 by Timothy Duke. In 2004, Dickinson was named Secretary of the Order of the Garter. He is also, inter alios, a Vice-President of the Anthony Powell Society and was elected President of the Society of Genealogists in 2005.

Honours

Decorations
  2006: Lieutenant of the Royal Victorian Order (LVO)

Medals
  2012: Queen Elizabeth II Diamond Jubilee Medal

Academic
 Fellow 2000: Society of Genealogists (FSG)

Arms

See also
Heraldry
Pursuivant
King of Arms

References

External links
The College of Arms
Debrett's People of Today
Society of Genealogists
CUHAGS Officer of Arms Index

1950 births
Living people
People from Gloucestershire
Presidents of the Oxford Union
Alumni of Exeter College, Oxford
English genealogists
English officers of arms
Members of the Middle Temple
Lieutenants of the Royal Victorian Order
English male non-fiction writers
Fellows of the Society of Genealogists